Triglyphus is a genus of hoverflies from the family Syrphidae in the order Diptera.

Species
Extant species:

 Triglyphus aureus Violovich, 1980
 Triglyphus escalerai Gil Collado, 1929
 Triglyphus formosanus Shiraki, 1930
 Triglyphus fulvicornis Bigot, 1884
 Triglyphus ikezakii Kuznetzov, 1990
 Triglyphus primus Loew, 1840
 Triglyphus sichuanicus Cheng, 1998

References

Diptera of Europe
Pipizinae
Hoverfly genera
Taxa named by Hermann Loew